Pricing Partners, founded in 2005, is a Thomson Reuters company that is both a financial software editor and a valuation service company. It is headquartered in Paris with offices in Paris, London and Hong Kong. The company provides pricing models, analytics and independent valuation for the financial services market. The company has been identified by Microsoft France as one of the promising French startups that uses Microsoft technologies for its software development. The coverage of its financial library is on all major asset classes. This encompasses derivatives on asset classes like interest rates, credit, equity, inflation, foreign exchange, commodity, life insurance and hybrids. Since 2012, it also provides independent calculation and valuation on proprietary algorithmic indexes.

Product
The product is addressing the needs for more transparency on financial products. Pricing Partners has developed an online platform (entitled Price-it) that provides independent valuation on OTC derivatives. The computations are based on scientific methods with mathematical probabilistic models (models extending the Black–Scholes model).

History
After years of research in the fixed income exotics trading desk at Goldman Sachs, Eric Benhamou, returned to France to head a quantitative research group at Natixis. In 2005, he created Pricing Partners to offer independent valuation models with its primary customer, Natixis.

In 2007, Pricing Partners decided to build the first French platform for independent valuation of derivatives, in a project supported by the French cluster Finance Innovation to promote the Paris marketplace and compete with the City of London.
 
In 2008, Pricing Partners unveiled a new version of its software that ran on a computing grid to reduce dramatically the computing time.

In 2009, Microsoft France identified Pricing Partners as one of the promising startups to develop software in finance with the use of the latest Microsoft technology. Pricing Partners was accepted in the IDEES program. The same year, Axa Hedging Services selects Pricing Partners to value part of its fixed income positions.

In 2010, Societe Generale Corporate & Investment Banking taps Pricing Partners to provide independent valuation on its structured products.

In 2011, this company received the award for the best pricing and analytics solution for structured products in all asset classes. This award was given by Structured Products Magazine. The same year, ICBC, the largest bank worldwide, signed with Pricing Partners.

In 2012, Pricing Partners receive a new distinction ranking by the Structured Products magazine in the category of structured products' valuation software. The same year, Pricing Partners started commercializing an independent valuation solution for proprietary and algorithmic indexes and tapped Natixis.

In 2013, Pricing Partners continues to be named to the Structured Products magazine ranking in the structured products' valuation software.
In June 2013, the company is acquired by the Thomson Reuters group. Finally, in December, Pricing Partners is named the Most Innovative Specialist Vendor of the year by Risk Magazine

Competitors
Pricing Partners' main competitors are:
 for its software business: Numerix, SunGard-FastVal, Fincad
 for its valuation business: Bloomberg, Markit, SunGard-FastVal, Prism Valuation, SuperDerivatives, Societe Generale Security Services

References

Financial services companies of France
Financial services companies established in 2005
Financial software companies